Grant Colburn (born in Wisconsin in 1966) is an American composer, pianist and harpsichordist.
He studied harpsichord with Igor Kipnis and composition with Irwin Sonenfield.

He is the author of six published collections of neo-baroque and neo-renaissance harpsichord music including most recently two volumes of Twelve Carols of Christmas arranged for Harpsichord or Organ and Six Voluntaries for the Organ or Harpsichord. Also two concertos for harpsichord and strings, another concerto for recorder and strings, music for recorder/flute with continuo and works for unaccompanied cello or viola da gamba, as well as songs for voice and continuo of which there are recordings by Fernando de Luca, Andreas Zappe, Ernst Stolz, Daniel Shoskes, Simone Stella, Robert Ronnes, Carson Cooman and Michele Barchi. A number of his works were adapted for Baroque lute by Roman Turovsky.

Colburn was the author of a feature article on period composition in the summer 2007 issue of Early Music America Magazine. More recently he authored an article on early music and its growing presence on YouTube in Early Music America Magazine for its winter 2008 issue. He is also a contributing reviewer and writer for Harpsichord and Fortepiano Magazine.

A concert of Colburn's compositions was given at the 2007 Boston Early Music Festival.

Colburn is one of the founding members of Vox Saeculorum, a society of composers working in early historical styles. He is also a member of the Delian Society, an organization devoted to preservation of tonal music.

See also
Musical historicism
Harpsichord

External links
Scharffeneck collection of Contemporary Early Music
Vox Saeculorum

References

Early Music America, Summer 2007.
Harpsichord and Fortepiano, Volume 11, No.2
Harpsichord and Fortepiano, Volume 12, No.1
Early Music America, Winter 2008.
Harpsichord and Fortepiano, Volume 13, No.2

1966 births
Living people
American male composers
21st-century American composers
Historicist composers
Composers for harpsichord
21st-century American male musicians
Vox Saeculorum